Gibberifera hepaticana is a species of moth of the family Tortricidae. It is found in China (Sichuan, Guizhou) and Japan.

The wingspan is 12–18 mm.

References

Moths described in 1994
Eucosmini